Socialists and Democrats (S&D) is a social-democratic faction of the Democratic Party (PD), a centre-left political party in Italy.

The faction was formed on 26 November 2015 as a split from the Italian Socialist Party (PSI) led by Marco Di Lello (who had been the party leader in the Chamber of Deputies until then), Lello Di Gioia (a long-time member of the PSI) and Giuseppe Lauricella (a former Socialist who had been elected with the PD in 2013). The faction includes also Rapisardo Antinucci, a former member of the Chamber, and Marco Gianfranceschi, president of "Giuseppe Saragat" Foundation.

Leadership
President: Fabio Guerriero
Coordinator: Claudia Bastianelli
Deputy Coordinator: Roberto Nativi
Organisational Secretary: Vincenzo Scognamiglio

References

External links
Official website

Democratic Party (Italy)
Social democratic parties in Italy
Democratic Party (Italy) factions
2015 establishments in Italy